Zulfi Bhutto of Pakistan: His Life & Times is a book written about Zulfikar Ali Bhutto by Stanley Wolpert. Wolpert described his subject thus:

References

Books about Zulfikar Ali Bhutto
Pakistani biographies
Pakistani books
Biographies about politicians
Oxford University Press Pakistan books